California's 34th State Assembly district is one of 80 California State Assembly districts. It is currently represented by Republican Tom Lackey of Palmdale.

District profile 
The district encompasses the southern ends of the San Joaquin Valley and the Sierra Nevada, along with the Tehachapi Mountains and a section of the northern Mojave Desert. The district is anchored by the city of Bakersfield.

Kern County – 55.6%
 Bakersfield – 78.1%
 Bear Valley Springs
 Maricopa
 Oildale
 Ridgecrest
 Taft
 Tehachapi

Election results from statewide races

List of Assembly Members
Due to redistricting, the 34th district has been moved around different parts of the state. The current iteration resulted from the 2011 redistricting by the California Citizens Redistricting Commission.

Election results 1992 - present

2020

2018

2016

2014

2012

2010

2008

2006

2004

2002

2000

1998

1996

1994

1992

See also 
 California State Assembly
 California State Assembly districts
 Districts in California

References

External links 
 California's 34th State Assembly District map — from the California Citizens Redistricting Commission.

34
Government of Kern County, California
Government of Bakersfield, California
Ridgecrest, California
San Joaquin Valley
Tehachapi Mountains